

History 
The Sweetgrass First Nation is a Cree First Nation reserve in Cut Knife, Saskatchewan, Canada.  Their territory is located 35 kilometers west of Battleford.  The reserve was established when Chief Sweetgrass signed Treaty 6 on September 9, 1876 with the Fort Pitt Indians.  Chief Sweetgrass was killed six months after signing Treaty 6, after which Sweetgrass's son, Apseenes (Young Sweet Grass), succeeded him. Apseenes was unsuccessful in leading the band so chiefdom was handed over to Wah-wee-kah-oo-tah-mah-hote (Strikes him on the back) after he signed Treaty 6 in 1876 at Fort Carlton. Wah-wee-kah-oo-tah-mah-hote served as chief between 1876-1883 but was deposed and Apseenes took over chiefdom.

History of the Cree 
The Cree (nêhiyawak) occupy Saskatchewan from the northern woodlands to the southern plains. Southern Cree groups moved onto the prairies in 1740 and became middlemen in the Fur Trade, forming an alliance with the Saulteaux and Assiniboine in the Iron Confederacy. After the Cree maintained positive relations with European traders and held their  trading advantage through the late 1800s, they became the dominant indigenous group in the northern section of North America.

Cree culture 
The Cree believe that humans have an intimate relationship with their environment. For example, hunters have pawâkanak (dream helpers) which lead them to game. The Cree also valued oral story telling and wâhkotowin (kinship) which is important for growing the connection with the Spirit of Nêhiyawêwin. Cree elders have found that their environment is capable of healing the mind and spirit. Sweetgrass First Nation's Elder, Archie Weenie, believes that land and plants have the power and energy to communicate with people which serves as a means of survival.

Population 
As of December 31, 2019, the Sweetgrass First Nation consists of 2051 registered band members. 749 people, including non-first nation people and people from other first nations, currently live on the reserve. The nation is currently led by Chief Lori Whitecalf.

Lands 
After Wah-wee-kah-oo-tah-mah-hote signed Treaty 6 at Fort Carlton on August 28, 1876, a reserve was established west of Battleford in 1884. Here, melded band members maintained crops and livestock while selling wood and hay to support their economy. The band currently controls 20,573.80 hectares of land with the largest block being 26 kilometers west of North Battleford.

Land Use 
38% of Sweetgrass First Nation land is used for cropland, 21% is native grassland, 34% is tree cover, and 2% constitutes small bodies of water and marshes. Other classes of land include forage and treed areas and other uses include residential areas.

Reserves 
The Sweetgrass Nation currently controls the following reserves:
 Sweetgrass 113
 Sweetgrass 113A
 Sweetgrass 113B
 Sweetgrass 113-C7
 Sweetgrass 113-C19
 Sweetgrass 113-D12
 Sweetgrass 113-E22
 Sweetgrass 113-F16
 Sweetgrass 113-G7
 Sweetgrass 113-H1
 Sweetgrass 113-I4
 Sweetgrass 113-J3
 Sweetgrass 113-K32
 Sweetgrass 113-L6
 Sweetgrass 113-M16
 Sweetgrass 113-N27
 Sweetgrass 113-P2
 Sweetgrass 113-S6

Government 
The Sweetgrass First Nation is governed by the Battlefords Agency Tribal Chiefs (BATC). The Sweetgrass First Nation BATC committee is currently represented by Chief Lori Whitecalf and Councillors Trina Albert, Donovan Arcand, Rod Atcheynum, Ray Fox, Hazen Paskimin, and Isaac Thomas.

Chiefs 
List of historic chiefs:

 Sweetgrass (1876)
 Wah-wee-kah-oo-tah-mah-hote (1876-1883)
 Apseenes (1884-1886)
 Harry Atcheynum (1920-1924)
 Sam Swimmer (1925-1964)
 Andrew Swimmer (1956-1957)
 Ben Atcheynum (1957-1958)
 James Favel (1958-1959)
 Solomon Albert (1959-1960)
 John Weenie (1961-1962)
 Adam Paskemin (1963-1964)
 Ben Atcheynum (1965-1966)
 Joseph Weenie (1967-1970)
 Ben Atcheynum (1971-1972)
 Stephen Pooyak (1972-1973)
 Ben Weenie (1973-1974)
 Stephen Pooyak (1974-1979)
 Gordon Albert (1979-1982)
 Roderick Atcheynum (1983-1984)
 Don Pooyak (1985-1988)
 Edward Wayne Standinghorn (1989-1999)
 Tommy Whitecalf (2000-2003)
 Rod Atcheynum Jr. (2003-2005)
 Edward Wayne Standinghorn (2005-2011)
 Lori Whitecalf (2011-2017)
 Laurence Paskemin (2017-2019)
 Lori Whitecalf (2019-present)

Economic Development 
According to the Sweetgrass First Nation 2020-2021 Annual Report, the band has planned to increase source revenues, focusing on urban reserve. The band was approved for $160,000 in funding from the Indigenous Services Canada to be used for site infrastructure. The band also increased employment by partnering with the BATC Atoskewin Success Centre to build two tiny homes which are now being occupied by tenants.

References

Division No. 13, Saskatchewan